Tylomelania neritiformis is a species of freshwater snail with an operculum, an aquatic gastropod mollusk in the family Pachychilidae.

Tylomelania neritiformis is the type species of the genus Tylomelania. This type species was subsequently designated by Johannes Thiele in 1929.

Distribution 
The type locality is the upper part of the Poso River in Sulawesi, Indonesia.

Description 
The shell is small and thick, with a short spire and five whorls. It is black in color with a violet tint.

References

External links 

neritiformis
Gastropods described in 1897
Freshwater snails